Ethnikos Katerini Football Club is a football club based in Katerini, Greece.  It was founded in 1973. The club won the Greek Amateur Cup in 1996. It has played three times in Gamma Ethniki (third national division), the seasons 1999-00, 2007-08 and 2008-09.

References

Football clubs in Central Macedonia
Association football clubs established in 1973
1973 establishments in Greece
Football clubs in Pieria
Football clubs in Katerini